Ian Lennox Taylor Smith (born 2 April 1952), sometimes listed as Ian Taylor-Smith, is a Scottish former footballer who played in the Scottish Football League for Queens Park, Heart of Midlothian and Queen of the South, and in the English Football League for Birmingham City. He played as a forward.

Smith was born in Edinburgh. He studied medicine, and eventually qualified as a doctor, combining this with playing football on an amateur or semi-professional basis. He spent time with several clubs in both Scotland and England, playing league football only where it did not interfere with his medical career. While with Birmingham City, he scored regularly for the reserve team and was highly rated, but his work at the Queen Elizabeth Medical Centre restricted him to only two first-team appearances.

His father, Jimmy, played professionally for Clyde and St Mirren in the 1930s, and his son, Matt, turned professional with Oldham Athletic in 2011.

Notes
A.  Because Smith's football career was intermittent, the years in the infobox represent years or seasons when he was known to have played for or to have been registered with each team: Queen's Park, Birmingham City, Heart of Midlothian, Bromsgrove Rovers, and Queen of the South.

References

External links

1952 births
Living people
Footballers from Edinburgh
Scottish footballers
Association football forwards
Queen's Park F.C. players
Birmingham City F.C. players
Heart of Midlothian F.C. players
Kidderminster Harriers F.C. players
Bromsgrove Rovers F.C. players
Queen of the South F.C. players
Scottish Football League players
English Football League players
20th-century Scottish medical doctors
21st-century Scottish medical doctors
Scotland amateur international footballers